Bishop Edward Nolan (1793-1837) was the Roman Catholic bishop in Kildare and Leighlin from 1834 until his death in 1837.

Edward Nolan born in Tullow, Co. Carlow in 1793. He was educated at Carlow College from 1804 until 1811 when he went to Maynooth College.

Following ordination in 1819 he taught at Carlow College serving in various roles such as Professor of Logic, Theology and Vice-President. In 1834, he succeeded Bishop James Doyle (JKL) following Doyle's death.

He died on 14 October 1837, and was succeeded in the bishopric by Francis Haly.

See also 
Catholic Church in Ireland

References 

1793 births
1837 deaths
People from County Carlow
19th-century Roman Catholic bishops in Ireland
Roman Catholic bishops of Kildare and Leighlin
Alumni of Carlow College
Alumni of St Patrick's College, Maynooth
Academics of St. Patrick's, Carlow College